The 2015 Dutch Championships took place in Rotterdam, Netherlands, and it served as the National Championships for Dutch gymnasts.

Medalists 

2015
2015 in European sport
2015 in gymnastics
International gymnastics competitions hosted by the Netherlands